Larry L. Howell  is a professor and Associate Academic Vice President (AAVP) at Brigham Young University (BYU). His research focuses on compliant mechanisms, including origami-inspired mechanisms, microelectromechanical systems, medical devices, space mechanisms, and developable mechanisms. Howell has also conducted research in lamina emergent mechanisms and nanoinjection. He received a bachelor's degree in mechanical engineering from BYU and master's and Ph.D. degrees from Purdue University. His Ph.D. advisor was Ashok Midha, who is regarded as the "Father of Compliant Mechanisms."

Biography 
Howell joined the BYU faculty in 1994 and served as chair of the Department of Mechanical Engineering from 2001 to 2007 and as Associate Dean of the Ira A. Fulton College of Engineering from 2016 to 2019. In addition to research, he has been a BYU AAVP since 2019. Prior to joining BYU, he was a Visiting Professor at Purdue University, a Finite-Element Analyst for Engineering Methods, Inc., and he was an engineer on the design of the YF-22, the first prototype of the U.S. Air Force F-22 Raptor. His patents, technical publications, and research focus on compliant mechanisms, including origami-inspired mechanisms, space mechanisms, microelectromechanical systems, and medical devices. His research has been funded by the National Science Foundation, Air Force Office of Scientific Research, NASA, Department of Defense, and industry. He is the author of the book 'Compliant Mechanisms and co-editor of the Handbook of Compliant Mechanisms, which are available in English and Chinese. His lab's work has also been featured in popular venues such as the PBS documentary program NOVA.
 
Howell is a Fellow of the American Society of Mechanical Engineers (ASME), the Past Chair of the ASME Mechanisms and Robotics Committee, and a past Associate Editor for the Journal of Mechanical Design. His research has been recognized by the National Science Foundation CAREER Award, the Theodore von Kármán Fellowship, and the ASME Mechanisms and Robotics Award, the 2015 "Vizzies" Overall People's Choice Award, the ASME Machine Design Award, and the Purdue University Outstanding Mechanical Engineer (alumni award) among others.

Howell is originally from Portage, a small city in northern Utah with a 2010 census population of 245 people.
As a young man, he served as a missionary for the Church of Jesus Christ of Latter-day Saints in Finland.

Books 
Howell, L.L., Compliant Mechanisms, John Wiley & Sons, New York, NY, 2001.

Morgan, D.C., Halverson, D., Magleby, S.P., Bateman, T., and Howell, L.L., Y Origami?: Explorations in Folding, American Mathematical Society (AMS), 2017.

Chinese Translation of Compliant Mechanisms published (under agreement with Wiley), by Higher Education Press, an official publisher of the State Education Department of China. Translator: Professor Yue-Qing Yu.

Howell, Larry L., Spencer P. Magleby, and Brian M. Olsen, eds. Handbook of Compliant Mechanisms. John Wiley & Sons, 2013.

Chinese Translation of Handbook of Compliant Mechanisms (under agreement with Wiley) by Higher Education Press, an official publisher of the State Education Department of China. Translators: Guimin Chen, Jingjun Yu, Hongbo Ma, and Lifang Qiu.

Selected articles 

Howell, L.L., “Complex Motion Guided without External Control,” Nature, News & Views, Vol. 561, pp. 470-471, 2018. 

Yellowhorse, A., Lang. R.J., Tolman, K.A., Howell, L.L., “Creating Linkage Permutations to Prevent Self-Intersection and Enable Deployable Networks of Thick-Origami,” Scientific Reports, Vol. 8, paper 12936, doi:10.1038/s41598-018-31180-4, 2018.

Lang, R.J., Tolman, K., Crampton, E. Magleby, S.P., Howell, L.L., “A Review of Thickness-Accommodation Techniques in Origami-Inspired Engineering,” Applied Mechanics Reviews, Vol. 70, 010805-1 to 010805-20, DOI: 10.1115/1.4039314, 2018. 

Lang, R.J. and Howell, L.L., “Rigidly Foldable Quadrilateral Meshes from Angle Arrays,” Journal of Mechanisms and Robotics, Vol. 10, 021004-1 to 021004-11, DOI: 10.1115/1.4038972, 2018. 

Dearden, J., Grames, C., Orr, J., Jensen, B.D., Magleby, S.P., Howell, L.L., “Cylindrical Cross-Axis Flexural Pivots,” Precision Engineering, Vol. 51, pp. 604-613, DOI: 10.1016/j.precisioneng.2017.11.001, 2018.

Merriam, E.G., Tolman, K.A., and Howell, L.L., “Integration of Advanced Stiffness-Reduction Techniques Demonstrated in a 3D-Printable Joint,” Mechanism and Machine Theory, Vol 105, pp. 260-271, DOI:10.1016/j.mechmachtheory.2016.07.009, 2016.

Morgan, J., Magleby, S.P., Howell, L.L., “An Approach to Designing Origami-Adapted Aerospace Mechanisms,” ASME Journal of Mechanical Design, Vol. 138, pp. 052301-1 to 052301-10, DOI: 10.1115/1.4032973, 2016. 

Nelson, T.G., Lang, R.L., Pehrson, N., Magleby, S.P., Howell, L.L., “Facilitating Deployable Mechanisms and Structures via Developable Lamina Emergent Arrays,” ASME Journal of Mechanisms and Robotics, Vol. 8, pp. 031006-1 to 031006-10, DOI: 10.1115/1.4031901, 2016. 

Hanna, B.H., Lund, J.N., Lang, R.J., Magleby, S.P., Howell, L.L., “Waterbomb Base: A Symmetric Single-Vertex Bistable Origami Mechanism,” Smart Materials and Structures, Vol. 23, paper no. 094009, DOI:10.1088/0964-1726/23/9/094009, 2014.  

Zirbel, S.A., Lang, R.J., Magleby, S.P., Thomson, M.W., Sigel, D.A., Walkemeyer, P.E., Trease, B.P., Howell, L.L., “Accommodating Thickness in Origami-Based Deployable Arrays,” Journal of Mechanical Design, Vol. 135, paper no. 111005, DOI: 10.1115/1.4025372, 2013.

Aten, Q.T., Jensen, B.D., Tamowski, S., Wilson, A.M., Howell, L.L., Burnett, S.H., “Nanoinjection: Pronuclear DNA Delivery using a Charged Lance,” Transgenic Research, DOI 10.1007/s11248-012-9610-6, Vol. 21, No. 6, pp. 1279–1290, 2012.

Greenberg, H.C., Gong, M.L., Howell, L.L., and Magleby, S.P., “Identifying Links Between Origami and Compliant Mechanisms,” Mechanical Sciences, doi:10.5194/ms-2-217-2011, Mechanical Sciences, Vol. 2, pp. 217–225, 2011.

Jacobsen, J.O., Winder, B.G., Howell, L.L., and Magleby, S.P., “Lamina Emergent Mechanisms and Their Basic Elements,” Journal of Mechanisms and Robotics, Vol. 2, No. 1, 011003-1 to 011003-9, 2010.

Lott, C.D., McLain, T.W., Harb, J.N., and Howell, L.L., “Modeling the Thermal Behavior of a Surface-micromachined Linear-displacement Thermomechanical Microactuator,” Sensors & Actuators: A. Physical, Vol. 101, Nos. 1-2, pp. 239–250, 2002.

Harb, J.N., LaFollette, R.M., Selfridge, R.H., and Howell, L.L., “Microbatteries for Self-Sustained Hybrid Micropower Supplies,” Journal of Power Sources, Vol. 104, No. 1, pp. 46–51, 2002.

Jensen, B.D., Howell, L.L., and Salmon, L.G., “Design of Two-Link, In-Plane, Bistable Compliant Micro-Mechanisms,” Journal of Mechanical Design, Trans. ASME, Vol. 121, No. 3, pp. 416–423, 1999.

Howell, L.L. and Midha, A., “Parametric Deflection Approximations for End-Loaded, Large-Deflection Beams in Compliant Mechanisms,” Journal of Mechanical Design, Trans. ASME, Vol. 117, pp. 156–165, March 1995.

Howell, L.L. and Midha, A., “A Method for the Design of Compliant Mechanisms with Small-Length Flexural Pivots,” Journal of Mechanical Design, Trans. ASME, Vol. 116, pp. 280–290, March 1994.

Selected Patents 
“Methods and Devices for Charged Molecule Manipulation,” Aten, Q.T., Howell, L.L., Jensen, B.D., Burnett, S.H., U.S. Patent 10,119,151, issued November 6, 2018.

“Surgical Retractor,” Bryce Edmondson, Quentin Allen, Michael McCain, John J. Pierce, Terri Bateman, Larry Howell, U.S. Patent 9,936,937, issued April 10, 2018.

“Surgical Forceps,” Bryce Edmondson, Clayton Grames, Landen Bowen, Eric Call, Terri Bateman, Spencer Magleby, Larry Howell, U.S. Patent 9,867,631, issued January 16, 2018. 

“Inverted-Serpentine Spinal Stability Device and Associated Methods,” Bowden, A.E., Howell, L.L., Nelson, T., Stephens, T., U.S. Patent 9,642,651, issued May 9, 2017.

“Spinal Implant,” Halverson, P., Howell, L.L., Magleby, S.P., and Bowden, A., U.S. Patent 9,314,346, issued April 19, 2016.

“Spinal Implant,” Halverson, P.A., Howell, L.L., Magleby, S.P., and Bowden, A.E., U.S. Patent 8,308,801, November 13, 2012.

“Carbon Nanotube-based Compliant Mechanism,” Culpepper, M.L., Magleby, S.P., Howell, L.L., DiBiasio, C., Panas, R., U.S. Patent 7,884,525, February 8, 2011.

References

External links 
 Compliant Mechanisms Research Group (compliantmechanisms.byu.edu)
 Origami in Space (news.byu.edu)
 BYU Devotional Address (byutv.org)
 PBS (pbs.org)
 PBS NOVA (pbs.org/wgbh/nova)
 PBS NOVA Origami Revolution (pbs.org/wgbh/nova/physics/origami-revolution.html)

Year of birth missing (living people)
Living people
American mechanical engineers
Brigham Young University alumni
Purdue University College of Engineering alumni
Brigham Young University faculty
Fellows of the American Society of Mechanical Engineers